Serbia participated at the 2018 Summer Youth Olympics in Buenos Aires, Argentina from 6 October to 18 October 2018.

Competitors

Medalists

Athletics

Boys
Field events

Girls
Track & road events

Gymnastics

Artistic
Serbia qualified one gymnast based on its performance at the 2018 European Junior Championship.

 Boys' artistic individual all-around – Vlada Raković

Individual Qualification

Multidiscipline

Karate

Serbia qualified one athlete based on its performance at one of the Karate Qualification Tournaments.

Shooting

Serbia qualified two sport shooters based on its performance at the 2017 European Championships.

Individual

Team

Swimming

Boys

Girls

Table tennis

Serbia qualified one table tennis player based on its performance at the Road to Buenos Aires (Africa) series.

Singles

Team

Taekwondo

Tennis

Singles

Doubles

References

External links
NOC Schedule – Serbia

2018 in Serbian sport
Nations at the 2018 Summer Youth Olympics
Serbia at the Youth Olympics